P. officinalis may refer to:
 Parietaria officinalis, a plant species
 Pulmonaria officinalis, an evergreen perennial plant species

See also
 Officinalis